Bashow may refer to:

 Bashow, a form of chaperoned quasi-date used by Hasidic Jews
 David Bashow, Canadian writer
 Pavel Bazhov (Pawel Petrowitsch Baschow/Bashow; 1879-1950), Russian writer; some works translated into English